Yehezkel Chazom (also spelled Yehezkel Hazum; born 1947) is an Israeli former international footballer who competed at the 1970 FIFA World Cup, having previously played for the Israeli national team during the 1966 World Cup qualifying campaign.

He scored 97 goals in 324 league games for Hapoel Tel Aviv.

Chazom played in five official games for the Israeli national side.

References

1947 births
Living people
Israeli footballers
Israel international footballers
1970 FIFA World Cup players
Hapoel Tel Aviv F.C. players
Liga Leumit players
Association football forwards